Henry Wood (1869–1944) was a British conductor.

Henry Wood may also refer to:
 Henry Wood (cricketer, born 1853) (1853–1919), English cricketer
 Henry Wood (Somerset cricketer) (1872–1950)
 Henry Wise Wood (1860–1941), Alberta politician
 Henry Wood (architect), architect of Ashton Court outbuildings (1805)
 Sir Henry Wood, 1st Baronet (1597–1671), Member of Parliament of England for Hythe 1661–71
 Henry Wood (minstrel), 19th-century New York City minstrel show manager
 Henry Alexander Wise Wood (1866–1939), American inventor
 Henry Conwell Wood (1840–1926), member of the Queensland Legislative Council
 Henry Moses Wood (1788–1867), architect based in Nottingham
 Henry Clay Wood (1832–1918), American Civil War general
 Henry Walter Wood (1825–1869), English architect
 Evelyn Wood (British Army officer) (Henry Evelyn Wood, 1838–1919), British field marshal and Victoria Cross recipient
 Ellen Wood (author) (1814–1887), writing as Mrs Henry Wood, English novelist
 Henry Wood, a fictional character in The Adventure of the Crooked Man, a Sherlock Holmes story by Arthur Conan Doyle
Henry Harvey Wood (1903-1977) founder of the Edinburgh Festival

See also
Harry Wood (disambiguation)
Henry Woods (disambiguation)